is a Japanese radio station operated by the public broadcaster, NHK. Its programming output, which consists of Japanese pop music, classical music, popular music and news bulletins programming is broadly similar to BBC's Radio 3 and KBS Radio 2.

Frequencies
82.5MHz Tokyo (Power: 10kW)

86.0MHz Aomori (Power: 3kW) 

85.3MHz Fukushima (Power: 1kW)

88.1MHz Osaka (Power: 10kW)

82.3MHz Niigata (Power: 1kW)

86.7MHz Akita (Power: 1kW)

See also
 NHK

External links
 

FM
Radio in Japan
Publicly funded broadcasters
Radio stations established in 1969
1969 establishments in Japan
Japanese radio networks
Classical music radio stations